Armorloricus is a genus of nanaloricate loriciferans, small to microscopic marine sediment-dwelling animals.

Species 
Three described species. 
 Armorloricus davidi Kristensen & Gad, 2004
 Armorloricus elegans Kristensen & Gad, 2004
 Armorloricus kristenseni Heiner, 2004

Typical characters: smooth lorica with large midventral and laterodorsal plates, very long mouth tube, etc.

References

Loricifera
Protostome genera